Marken Michel (born July 6, 1993) is an American football wide receiver who is a free agent. He played college football at UMass before signing with the Minnesota Vikings as an undrafted free agent in 2016. Michel has also played for the Calgary Stampeders of the Canadian Football League (CFL), as well as the Philadelphia Eagles and Carolina Panthers of the NFL.

High school and college career
Michel played receiver and safety at American Heritage High School in Plantation, Florida. He made 27 catches for 607 yards and eight touchdowns during his senior season. Michel played four seasons for the UMass Minutemen, where he had 92 catches for 1,016 yards and 6 touchdowns in addition to 28 carries for 162 yards and 2 touchdowns.

Professional career

Minnesota Vikings
Michel signed with the Minnesota Vikings of the National Football League as an undrafted free agent on May 6, 2016. He was waived on August 30, 2016.

Calgary Stampeders
Michel signed as a free agent with the Calgary Stampeders of the Canadian Football League on May 17, 2017. He was nominated as the CFL West Division Rookie of the Year in 2017 after 780 yards receiving and 3 touchdowns in just 13 games played. Michel played in 11 regular season games for the Stampeders, catching 31 passes for the 435 yards with 5 touchdowns. On October 12, 2018 Michel was placed on the six-game injured reserve with a broken scapula.

Philadelphia Eagles
On January 10, 2019, Michel signed with the Philadelphia Eagles of the National Football League. He was waived during final roster cuts on August 30, 2019. He was re-signed to the practice squad on December 5, 2019. He signed a reserve/future contract with the Eagles on January 6, 2020. He was waived on April 30, 2020.

Carolina Panthers
On August 16, 2020, Michel signed with the Carolina Panthers. He was waived during final roster cuts on September 5, 2020, and signed to the practice squad the next day. He was elevated to the active roster on October 24, October 29, November 7, and December 12 for the team's weeks 7, 8, 9, and 14 games against the New Orleans Saints, Atlanta Falcons, Kansas City Chiefs, and Denver Broncos, and reverted to the practice squad after each game. He signed a reserve/future contract with the Panthers on January 4, 2021. He was waived on August 9, 2021.

Philadelphia Eagles (second stint)
Michel was claimed off waivers by the Eagles on August 10, 2021, but was waived on August 29, 2021.

Washington Football Team / Commanders
Michel signed with the practice squad of the Washington Football Team on September 17, 2021. On January 10, 2022, he signed a reserve/future contract after the 2021 regular season ended. Michel was waived by the Commanders on August 30, 2022, and signed to the practice squad the next day.

Personal life
His brother, Sony Michel, was drafted by the New England Patriots in the first round of the 2018 NFL Draft.

References

External links
 
 Washington Commanders bio
 UMass Minutemen bio

Calgary Stampeders players
Canadian football wide receivers
1993 births
Living people
UMass Minutemen football players
American football wide receivers
Players of American football from Florida
Sportspeople from Broward County, Florida
American sportspeople of Haitian descent
People from Plantation, Florida
Philadelphia Eagles players
Washington Football Team players
Washington Commanders players
Carolina Panthers players
American Heritage School (Florida) alumni